We're Outta Here! is the fourth live album by the American punk band the Ramones. It was released on November 18, 1997, through Eagle Rock Records.

Background
The album was recorded for Billboard Live at The Palace in Los Angeles, California on August 6, 1996, when the Ramones performed their final concert. The show featured several special guests, including former band member Dee Dee Ramone, as well as members of bands who were influenced by the Ramones such as Lemmy from Motörhead, Eddie Vedder from Pearl Jam, Tim Armstrong and Lars Frederiksen of Rancid, and Chris Cornell and Ben Shepherd of Soundgarden. We're Outta Here! is the only album by the Ramones to receive a Parental Advisory sticker, due to vocalist Joey Ramone shouting out profanities during or in between songs.

Track listing

Personnel 
Ramones
C. J. Ramone – bass guitar; backing vocals; lead vocals on "The Crusher", "Wart Hog", and "R.A.M.O.N.E.S."
Joey Ramone – lead vocals
Johnny Ramone – guitar
Marky Ramone – drums

Guest musicians
Tim Armstrong – guitar on "53rd & 3rd"
Lars Frederiksen – guitar and vocals on "53rd & 3rd"
Lemmy Kilmister – bass guitar and vocals on "R.A.M.O.N.E.S."
Dee Dee Ramone – lead vocals on "Love Kills"
Ben Shepherd – guitar on "Chinese Rock"
Eddie Vedder – vocals on "Anyway You Want It"

References

Ramones live albums
1997 live albums
Albums produced by Daniel Rey
Eagle Rock Entertainment live albums
Eagle Rock Entertainment video albums